Hưng Mỹ may refer to several places in Vietnam, including:

 Hưng Mỹ, Cà Mau, a rural commune of Cái Nước District.
 , a rural commune of Hưng Nguyên District.
 , a rural commune of Châu Thành District, Trà Vinh.